is a Japanese politician of the Democratic Party of Japan, a member of the House of Councillors in the Diet (national legislature). A native of Kiso, Nagano and graduate of Waseda University, he joined Honda in 1972 and was elected to the House of Councillors for the first time in 2001.

References

External links 
 Official website in Japanese.

Members of the House of Councillors (Japan)
Living people
1949 births
Democratic Party of Japan politicians